Room Enough For All is the thirty-first album by Battlefield Band and their twenty-third studio album, released on the Temple Records label by mid-March 2013 in the USA & Canada in CD (to coincide with the band's tour) and in early April 2013 worldwide in CD & Digital Download formats.

Overview
Room Enough For All is Battlefield Band's second studio album to be recorded by the band's new line-up since the last remaining founding member Alan Reid's definitive departure at the end of 2010.

Critical reception
Room Enough For All was awarded "Album of the Year" at the 2013 MG Alba Scots Trad Music Awards.

Track listing
"Bagpipe Music" 3:33 
"Major George Morrison DSO..." 4:31 
"Farewell To Indiana" 3:53 
"The Garron Trotting..." 4:53 
"Nic Coiseam" 4:08 
"The Hairy Angler Fish..." 3:49 
"Ceann Loch an Duin..." 4:22 
"Duanag an t-Seòladair" 4:05 
"The Eight Men of Moidart..." 3:06 
"In Contempt" 3:37 
"Tynes In Overtime!" 3:24

Personnel

Battlefield Band
Sean O'Donnell - vocals & guitar
Alasdair White - fiddle, whistle, tenor guitar 
Ewen Henderson - fiddle, vocals Highland bagpipes, small pipes, whistle, piano
Mike Katz - Highland bagpipes, bouzouki, small pipes, whistle, bass guitar, tenor guitar, guitar

Guests
Mike Whellans - Moothie / Harmonica

References

External links
 Room Enough For All album page from the band's website

Battlefield Band albums
2013 albums